Osvaldo Benavides (born June 14, 1979, in Mexico City, Mexico), is a Mexican actor, writer, producer and cinematographer.

Early life 
Born in Mexico City, Mexico, currently resides in Tepoztlán, Morelos. Osvaldo began acting at age 9 years. He has participated in musical theater rods as: "El Graduado" and "Todos eran mis hijos".

Career 

Benavides began his career in television from an early age, on the telenovela El abuelo y yo, along to Gael García Bernal, and Ludwika Paleta. Two years later, in 1995 he played Nandito, the lost son of María la del Barrio, thanks to his character, he won in the edition 14th TVyNovelas Awards for Best Young Lead Actor. In that same year he also participated in the telenovela El premio mayor as Chicles. In 1996 he played Lazarito in the telenovela Te sigo amando, along to Claudia Ramírez, and Luis José Santander, and won again at the 16th TVyNovelas Awards as Best Young Lead Actor. In 1998, he participated in the telenovela Preciosa, and later in the film La primera noche, with the latter he made his film debut, and for which he stood out. In the year 2000, he participated in telenovela Locura de amor, and again stood out in the cinema as Rocco, in the film Por la libre.

In 2001, he participated in the film Piedras verdes, a film about the philosophical-spiritual discovery of the protagonist. In that same year he also participated in the film La segunda noche, and Seres humanos. In 2002, he appeared in Daniela, and two years later he played Damián in the telenovela Piel de otoño, and in 2006 to Curioso, in the film Un mundo maravilloso. After these last two productions, he moved away from the world of telenovelas and the acting for eleven years.

In 2022, Osvaldo began filming Noche de Bodas (Wedding Night); Osvaldo will direct and star in the production.  On October 12, 2022, during a break in filming on Majahual beach in Oaxaca Mexico, two actors, Marco Antonio Curiel Pérez and Luis Manuel Gutiérrez, died by drowning.  The two men who worked as extras on the production could not escape the sea due to high tide.  A third actor managed to be rescued successfully.

Filmography

Films roles

Television roles

Awards and nominations

References

External links 
 

1979 births
20th-century Mexican male actors
Male actors from Mexico City
21st-century Mexican male actors
Mexican male film actors
Living people
Mexican male telenovela actors